Uniontown is an unincorporated community and census-designated place (CDP) in Crawford County, Arkansas, United States. Uniontown has a post office with ZIP code 72955.

It was first listed as a CDP in the 2020 census with a population of 112.

History
The first permanent settlement at Uniontown was made in the 1840s by the Howell family. A post office has been in operation at Uniontown since 1881.

Slack-Comstock-Marshall Farm, which is listed on the National Register of Historic Places, is located in the community.

Demographics

2020 census

Note: the US Census treats Hispanic/Latino as an ethnic category. This table excludes Latinos from the racial categories and assigns them to a separate category. Hispanics/Latinos can be of any race.

References

Unincorporated communities in Crawford County, Arkansas
Unincorporated communities in Arkansas
Census-designated places in Arkansas
Census-designated places in Crawford County, Arkansas